Gerry Brown is an American recording engineer.

Gerry Brown is also the name of:

 Gerry Brown (ice hockey) (1917–1998), Canadian professional ice hockey player
 Gerry Brown (drummer) (born 1951), American jazz drummer
 Gerry Brown, American soccer player in the American Soccer League (1933–83)

See also
Gerry Browne (disambiguation)
Jerry Brown (disambiguation)
Gerald Brown (disambiguation)